Lonemore can refer to several places in the Highland council area of Scotland:

Lonemore, Ross-shire, near Gairloch
Lonemore, Sutherland, near Dornoch